Kokoro is a 1914 novel by Natsume Sōseki.

Kokoro may also refer to:

People with the given name
, Japanese professional sport climber and boulderer
, Japanese voice actress 
, Japanese judoka
, Japanese child actor
, Japanese fashion model

Fictional characters
Kokoro (心) (Dead or Alive), a character in the Dead or Alive video game series
Kokoro (ココロ), a character from the manga and anime series One Piece
Kokoro Fuyukawa (冬川 心), one of the main characters of the visual novel Remember 11: The Age of Infinity
Kokoro Katsura (桂 心), a character from the visual novel School Days
Kokoro Aichi, a character from the webcomic Sleepless Domain, by Mary Cagle
Kokoro Misaki (岬 こころ) a character from the manga series Amanchu!
Kokoro Mitsume (光目 こころ), a character from the video game Super Danganronpa Another 2
Kokoro Yotsuba (四葉 こころ), a character from the Japanese anime Kamisama Minarai: Himitsu no Cocotama
Hata no Kokoro (秦　の　こころ), a character from the Japanese video game Touhou Project

Film and television
 The Heart (1955 film), a 1955 film directed by Kon Ichikawa, based on Natsume Sōseki's novel
 The Heart (1973 film), a 1973 film directed by Kaneto Shindō, based on Natsume Sōseki's novel
 Kokoro (TV series), a 2003 Japanese television, part of the Asadora series
 Kokoro: The Heart Within, a 1995 documentary series

Music
 Kokoro (musician) (1925–2009), a blind Nigerian musician
 "Kokoro" (SS501 song), a Japanese song by Korean boy band SS501
 "Kokoro", a song from the video game  Xenosaga Episode I
 "Kokoro", an instrumental music track from New Age artist Kitarō on the 1994 album Mandala
 Kokoro Dance, a butoh dance troupe in Canada

Places
Kokoro, Benin, a town in Benin
Kokoro, Niger, a town and commune in Niger

Other uses
 Kokoro (snack food), a snack food in Nigeria
 Kokoro (vegetable), a variety of yam cultivated in West Africa
 Kokoro (Yoruba), a Yoruba word meaning "worm", "grub" or "insect"
 Kokoro (Japanese: 心), meaning "heart" or "mind" in Chinese characters
Kokoro: Hints and Echoes of Japanese Life, an 1896 collection by Lafcadio Hearn 
 Kokoro (food chain), a Korean-Japanese food chain based in the United Kingdom

Japanese unisex given names